Everson Ridge is a ridge extending from Jebsen Point to Tioga Hill on Signy Island. It was named by the UK Antarctic Place-Names Committee after Inigo Everson, a British Antarctic Survey biologist on Signy Island, 1965–66.

References 

Ridges of Antarctica